Kiss This may refer to:
 Kiss This (album), a 1992 compilation album by the Sex Pistols
 Kiss This (Aaron Tippin song)
 Kiss This (The Struts song)